Albini or de Albini (of white) is a surname. Notable people with the surname include:

Abramo Albini (born 1948), Italian Olympic rower
Alessandro Albini (1568–1646), Italian painter
Alfred Albini (1896–1978), Croatian architect
Carlo Albini (1914–1976), Italian footballer
Franco Albini (1905–1977), Italian architect and designer
Franz von Albini (1748–1816), German judge and statesman
Giuseppe Albini (1827-1911), Italian physician
Septimiu Albini (1861-1919), Romanian journalist and activist
Srećko Albini (1869–1933), Croatian composer, conductor, and music publisher
Steve Albini (born 1961), American singer-songwriter and recording engineer

See also
Albini-Braendlin rifle, a single-shot Belgian rifle adopted in 1867
William d'Aubigny (disambiguation)

Italian-language surnames